In addition to Quadratus of Athens (Quadratus the Apologist), there are several Christian saints with the name Quadratus (sometimes spelled Codratus):

Quadratus of Africa
Quadratus of Africa was martyred in Africa Proconsularis on an unknown date.  His feast day is celebrated on May 26.  He was the subject of a panegyric by Saint Augustine of Hippo.

Quadratus of Corinth
Quadratus or Codratus was born on a mountain near Corinth, where his mother had fled to escape a persecution, during the third century, against Christians. He was a hermit and healer. During the Decian persecution, unable to persuade Quadratus and his friends Cyprian, Dionysius, Anectus, Paul and Crescens to deny Christ, the military prefect ordered the martyrs to be thrown to wild beasts, but the beasts did not touch them. They were then beheaded with a sword. His feast day is March 10.

Quadratus of Herbipolis
His feast day is May 7.  He was martyred around 257 at Herbipolis in Asia Minor (modern-day Turkey) during the reign of Valerian.  He had also been imprisoned at Nicomedia, Nicaea, and Apamea.

Quadratus of Nicomedia
Quadratus or Codratus was a nobleman who was martyred at Nicomedia (modern-day Turkey) during the reign of Valerian.  His feast day is March 10.

Quadratus, Theodosius, Emmanuel and Companions
This Quadratus or Codratus was a martyred bishop in Anatolia (modern-day Turkey). He was arrested and put to death with forty-two other martyrs, including Emmanuel and Theodosius, during the persecution of the Christians by Diocletian in 304. Their feast day is March 26.

References

Groups of Christian martyrs of the Roman era
Saints of Roman Corinth
Saints from Roman Anatolia
4th-century Christian martyrs
4th-century Romans
Year of birth unknown